Hou Xuemei (born 27 February 1962 in Zhejiang) is a retired Chinese discus thrower. Her personal best throw was 68.62 metres, achieved in September 1988 in Tianjin. The Chinese, and Asian, record is currently held by Xiao Yanling with 71.68 metres.

Achievements

References

1962 births
Living people
Athletes (track and field) at the 1988 Summer Olympics
Chinese female discus throwers
Olympic athletes of China
Athletes from Zhejiang
Asian Games medalists in athletics (track and field)
Athletes (track and field) at the 1986 Asian Games
Athletes (track and field) at the 1990 Asian Games
Universiade medalists in athletics (track and field)
Asian Games gold medalists for China
Medalists at the 1986 Asian Games
Medalists at the 1990 Asian Games
Universiade gold medalists for China
Universiade bronze medalists for China
Medalists at the 1987 Summer Universiade
Medalists at the 1989 Summer Universiade
20th-century Chinese women